Santram Varma  (Born In 1970) is an Indian film and Television director, producer and screenwriter, known for his works predominantly in Hindi Television and Cinema. His most notable works include Krishna Cottage (2004), Virrudh (2007), Jodha Akbar (2013), Naagin (2015 TV series) for Colors. One of the Favourite Director of Ekta Kapoor in Balaji Telefilms

Serials

Awards and nominations

Films

Director
Krishna Cottage (Balaji Telefilms)
 Satti Par Satto (T-Square Telefilms)List of Gujarati films of 2018

Associate Producer
Paying Guests (Mukta Arts)

References

External links 
 Santram Verma
 

Indian television directors
Living people
1970 births